The consumption of grapes and raisins presents a potential health threat to dogs.  Their toxicity to dogs can cause the animal to develop acute kidney injury (the sudden development of kidney failure) with anuria (a lack of urine production).  The phenomenon was first identified by the Animal Poison Control Center (APCC), run by the American Society for the Prevention of Cruelty to Animals (ASPCA).  Approximately 140 cases were seen by the APCC in the one year from April 2003 to April 2004, with 50 developing symptoms and seven dying.

It is not clear that the observed cases of kidney failure following ingestion are due to grapes only. Clinical findings suggest raisin and grape ingestion can be fatal, but the mechanism of toxicity is still considered unknown.

Cause and pathology
The reason some dogs develop kidney failure following ingestion of grapes and raisins is not known. Types of grapes involved include both seedless and seeded, store-bought and homegrown, and grape pressings from wineries.  A mycotoxin is suspected to be involved, but none has been found in grapes or raisins ingested by affected dogs.  The dose-response relationship has not been determined, but one study estimated 3 g/kg or greater for grapes or raisins. An April 2021 letter to the editor of JAVMA hypothesized that the tartaric acid in grapes could be the cause.
The most common pathological finding is proximal renal tubular necrosis.  In some cases, an accumulation of an unidentified golden-brown pigment was found within renal epithelial cells.

Clinical signs and diagnosis
Vomiting and diarrhea are often the first clinical signs of grape or raisin toxicity.  They often develop within a few hours of ingestion.  Pieces of grapes or raisins may be present in the vomitus or stool.  Further symptoms include weakness, not eating, increased drinking, and abdominal pain. Acute kidney failure develops within 48 hours of ingestion.  A blood test may reveal increases in blood urea nitrogen (BUN), creatinine, phosphorus, and calcium.

Treatment
Emesis (induction of vomiting) is the generally recommended treatment if a dog has eaten grapes or raisins within the past two hours. A veterinarian may use an emetic such as  apomorphine to cause the dog to vomit. Further treatment may involve the use of activated charcoal to adsorb remaining toxins in the gastrointestinal tract and intravenous fluid therapy in the first 48 hours following ingestion to induce diuresis and help to prevent acute kidney failure. Vomiting is treated with antiemetics and the stomach is protected from uremic gastritis (damage to the stomach from increased BUN) with H2 receptor antagonists. BUN, creatinine, calcium, phosphorus, sodium, and potassium levels are closely monitored. Dialysis of the blood (hemodialysis) and peritoneal dialysis can be used to support the kidneys if anuria develops. Oliguria (decreased urine production) can be treated with dopamine or furosemide to stimulate urine production.

The prognosis is guarded in any dog developing symptoms of toxicosis. A negative prognosis has been associated with oliguria or anuria, weakness, difficulty walking, and severe hypercalcemia (increased blood calcium levels).

References 

Dog health
Grape
Veterinary toxicology